Pierceville Township is a township in Finney County, Kansas, USA.  As of the 2000 census, its population was 551.

Geography
According to the USGS, it contains one cemetery, Pierceville.

Transportation
Pierceville Township contains two airports or landing strips: Finney Company Feedyard Incorporated Airport and Garden City Municipal Airport.

References
 USGS Geographic Names Information System (GNIS)

External links
 US-Counties.com
 City-Data.com

Townships in Finney County, Kansas
Townships in Kansas